A bay is an area of water bordered by land on three sides.

Bay, Bays or baying may also refer to:

Places

China 
 Bay County or Baicheng County, Aksu Prefecture, Xinjiang Uyghur Autonomous Region

France 
 Bay, Haute-Saône, a commune

Philippines 
 Bay, Laguna, a municipality
 Bay River

Somalia 
 Bay, Somalia

United Kingdom 
 Morecambe Bay, the largest intertidal bay in England

United States 
 Bay, Arkansas
 Bay, Springfield, Massachusetts, a neighborhood
 Bay, Missouri
 Bay County, Florida
 Bay County, Michigan
 Bays, Kentucky
 Bays, Ohio
 Chesapeake Bay, an estuary in the District of Columbia, Maryland, Delaware, and Virginia
 Jamaica Bay, in Queens, New York
 San Francisco Bay, a shallow estuary in the U.S. state of California
 San Francisco Bay Area, or simply the Bay Area

Animals and plants

Animals
 Bay (horse), a color of the hair coats of some horses
 Baying, a kind of howling made by canines

Plants
 Bay laurel, the evergreen laurel tree species Laurus nobilis
 Bay leaf, the aromatic leaves of several species of the Laurel family
 Rose bay, a common name for Rhododendron maximum

Architecture and interior design
 Bay (architecture), a module in classical or Gothic architecture
 Bay, the name in English of a ken, a Japanese unit of measure and proportion
 Bay window, a window space projecting outward from the main walls of a building and forming a bay in a room
 Bay (shelving), a basic unit of library shelving

Arts, entertainment, and media

Radio stations
 Bay Radio (Malta), a radio station located in Malta
 Bay Radio (Spain), a radio station serving the Valencian Community in Spain
 Heart North Lancashire & Cumbria, formerly The Bay, a radio station in North West England
 Hot Radio, originally operating as The Bay 102.8, a radio station in Dorset, England, 
 Swansea Bay Radio, a radio station in South Wales
 WZBA, a classic rock radio station, operating as 100.7 The Bay, in Westminster, Maryland

Other arts, entertainment, and media
 The Bay (film), a 2012 American found footage horror film
 The Bay (web series), a soap opera web series that premiered in 2010
 "The Bay", a 2011 single by Metronomy
 The Bay (TV series), a British crime drama

Businesses
 Bank of Ayudhya, a Thai commercial bank (Stock symbol: BAY)
 Bay Networks, a network hardware vendor acquired by Nortel Networks in 1998
 Bay Trading Company, a retailer of woman's clothes in the UK
 Hudson's Bay (retailer) or The Bay, a chain of department stores in Canada

Transport
 Baia Mare Airport in Baia Mare, Romania
 Bay platform, a dead-end platform at a railway station which has through lines
 Bay station, a subway station in Toronto
 Bay, the space enclosed by a set of struts on a biplane (see )
 Loading bay, a synonym for loading dock

People 
 Bay (chancellor), a royal scribe to an ancient Egyptian ruler
 Bay (surname)
 Bay Buchanan (born 1948), prominent conservative political commentator

Other uses
 Bay (cloth), a coarse woolen cloth similar to Baize but lighter in weight and with shorter pile.
Drive bay, an area for adding hardware in a computer
 Sick bay, nautical term for the location in a ship that is used for medical purposes
 The Bay School of San Francisco, a private high school
 Substation bay, an interconnection of equipment in an electrical substation

See also
 Bay Area (disambiguation)
 Bay breeze (disambiguation)
 Bay Bridge (disambiguation)
 Bay City (disambiguation)
 Bay School (disambiguation)
 Bay Street (disambiguation)
 Bay Township (disambiguation)
 Baye (disambiguation)
 Bae (disambiguation)
 Bays (disambiguation)
 Bey (disambiguation)
 eBay